Elizabeth McGrath,  (born 20 March 1945) is a British art historian, curator, and academic. Spending all of her career at the Warburg Institute of the University of London, she was curator of the photographic collection from 1991 to 2010 and Professor of the History of Art from 2000 to 2010. She additionally held the Slade Professorship of Fine Art at the University of Oxford from 1989 to 1990. Since her retirement in 2010, she has been Emeritus Professor and an honorary fellow of the Warburg Institute.

Honours
In 1998, McGrath was elected a Fellow of the British Academy (FBA), the United Kingdom's national academy for the humanities and social sciences. In 2003, she was elected a Member of the Royal Flemish Academy of Belgium for Science and the Arts.

Her book Rubens: Subjects from History, a volume in the Corpus Rubenianum Ludwig Burchard (London 1997), won the Mitchell Prize in the History of Art for 1998, and was awarded the Eugene Baie prize of the province of Antwerp (for a work on Flemish Cultural History) for the years 1993–98.

Selected works

References

1945 births
British art historians
Women art historians
British curators
British women curators
Academics of the Warburg Institute
Slade Professors of Fine Art (University of Oxford)
Fellows of the British Academy
Living people
British women historians